Paunküla Landscape Conservation Area is a nature park which is located in Harju County, Estonia.

The area of the nature park is 623 ha.

The protected area was founded in 1981 to protect Paunküla Hills and the lakes between the hills.

References

Nature reserves in Estonia
Geography of Harju County